Buchholzia may refer to:
 Buchholzia (plant), a plant genus in the family Capparaceae
 Buchholzia (worm), an animal genus in the family Enchytraeidae